The Specialty Coffee Association of America (SCAA), founded in 1982, was a non-profit trade organization for the specialty coffee industry. With members located in more than 40 countries, SCAA represented different segments of the specialty coffee industry, including producers, roasters, importers/exporters and retailers.

In 2005, management discovered that former Chief Operating Officer Scott Welker had embezzled more than $465,000. SCAA members contributed a quarter of a million dollars beyond their membership dues to keep the organization running. In 2009, the U.S. Federal Court in Santa Ana, California sentenced Welker to 33 months in federal prison.

In January 2017, the Specialty Coffee Association of America and the Specialty Coffee Association of Europe merged into one Specialty Coffee Association or simply SCA. The new SCA has more than 10,000 active members.

See also

National Coffee Association

Notes

External links
Specialty Coffee Association website

Specialty coffees
Trade associations based in the United States
Coffee organizations
Agricultural organizations based in the United States
Organizations established in 1982
Coffee in the United States
1982 establishments in the United States